Monroe County is a county in the U.S. state of Michigan. As of the 2020 Census, the population was 154,809.  The largest city and county seat is Monroe. The county was established as the second county (after Wayne County) in the Michigan Territory in 1817 and was named for then-President James Monroe.

Monroe County is coterminous with the Monroe, MI micropolitan statistical area.

History

Before the county's formation, the primary settlement was Frenchtown, which was settled in as early as 1784 along the banks of the River Raisin. The small plot of land was given to the early French settlers by the Potawatomi Native Americans, and the area was claimed for New France. The settlement of Frenchtown and the slight northerly settlement of Sandy Creek drew in a total of about 100 inhabitants. During the War of 1812, the area was the site of the Battle of Frenchtown, which was the worst American defeat in the war and remains the deadliest conflict ever on Michigan soil. The site of the battle is now part of the River Raisin National Battlefield Park.

Monroe County was formed from the southern portion of Wayne County in 1817. At the time, the Michigan Territory, which had not yet received statehood, consisted of only Wayne County since Detroit was the only area with a population over 1,000 people. When the area became more populated, the southern portion of Wayne County was broken off to form Monroe County with the settlement of Frenchtown was platted with the name "Monroe". The settlement also incorporated as a village in 1817 and became the county seat of Monroe County. The county and its county seat were named in honor of then-President James Monroe in anticipation for his upcoming visit to the area. Shortly after its formation, Monroe County's population was recorded at only 336 in the 1820 census.

Monroe County's most famous resident, George Armstrong Custer (1839–1876), moved to Monroe as a child and lived with his half-sister and brother-in-law. Although not born in Monroe, he attended school in Monroe and later moved away to attend the United States Military Academy. He returned to Monroe in 1864 during the Civil War to marry Elizabeth Bacon (1842–1933), whom he met while previously living in Monroe. Much of Custer's family resided in Monroe, included Elizabeth Bacon, Henry Armstrong Reed (1858–1876), and Boston Custer (1848–1876). Following their deaths in the Battle of the Little Bighorn, Henry and Boston were interred and memorialized in Monroe's historic Woodland Cemetery, as are many members of Bacon's family. Although dying in the same battle, George Custer was interred at West Point Cemetery, and Elizabeth Bacon was buried next to him when she died many decades later. In 1910, then-President William Howard Taft and the widowed Elizabeth Bacon unveiled an equestrian statue of Custer that now rests at the corner of Elm Street and Monroe Street in the heart of downtown Monroe.

Border disputes

When the city of Toledo was incorporated in 1833, it was part of Monroe County instead of the state of Ohio.  The small strip of land surrounding the mouth of the Maumee River was under the jurisdiction of the Michigan Territory, because the borders originally drawn up for the Northwest Ordinance of 1787 set a territorial boundary as the southernmost edge of Lake Michigan. When Ohio became the first in the Northwest Territory to gain statehood in 1803, the state's northern border claimed this important area, even though the boundaries of the Michigan Territory when it was formally organized in 1805 also included this area. From 1833 to 1836, Toledo belonged to Monroe County, which led to the very heated Toledo War border dispute between the Michigan Territory and the state of Ohio for the area known as the Toledo Strip. In late 1836, President Andrew Jackson, who disliked the Michigan Territory's "boy governor" Stevens T. Mason, intervened on behalf of Ohio and gave the Toledo Strip to Ohio in exchange for Michigan getting the Upper Peninsula, then considered a wasteland, when it became a state on January 26, 1837. While Toledo was part of Monroe County, it surpassed Monroe in terms of size and population. In 1915, Michigan Governor Woodbridge N. Ferris and Ohio Governor Frank B. Willis called a ceremonial truce to the border conflict when new state line markers were erected.

The new state line at the end of the Toledo War was established at approximately the 41°44' north latitude line just north of the mouth of the Maumee River. This gave the river and the city of Toledo to the state of Ohio, but it also created an unintended consequence for a specific area of Michigan. The state line also cut through the smaller Ottawa River and inadvertently cut off a small section of Monroe County, creating an exclave known as the "Lost Peninsula". The few Michigan residents that live on the small peninsula must travel south into Lucas County, Ohio on a 10-minute drive before going north to get back to the rest of Michigan. The Lost Peninsula is administered by Erie Township and most of the peninsula contains a marina.

Monroe County's boundary remained unchanged from 1837 to 1973, when a final unresolved dispute from the Toledo War was resolved, 136 years after the conflict. Ownership over the very small, uninhabited Turtle Island in a remote portion of Lake Erie was disputed for decades after the island's lighthouse was shut down. The island was long controlled by Michigan but still disputed by Ohio. On February 22, 1973, an agreement was met, and state lines were redrawn for the last time to cut exactly through the tiny island, which divided the island between Monroe County and Lucas County. Erie Township has jurisdiction over the Michigan half of Turtle Island, and the city of Toledo controls the other half. What to do with the island remains a contentious issue since neither side can come to any agreement. Today, the island has several abandoned structures, and the recent building of new structures was halted by a court order.

Economic history

Prior to the mid-20th century, Monroe County remained largely agrarian and was well known for its numerous paper mills — the first of which was founded in 1834.  In 1916, August Meyer founded Brisk Blast, which was a bicycle pump manufacturer that was later expanded to produce automotive shocks in 1919 as the Monroe Auto Equipment Company. In 1977, the company merged with the international Tenneco company. Today, their world headquarters are located in Monroe Charter Township and continue to manufacture Monroe Shocks and Struts.  In 1927, cousins Edward Knabusch and Edwin Shoemaker founded a small furniture making company in their garage. This would later evolve into the worldwide La-Z-Boy Incorporated, and their world headquarters are located on North Telegraph Road in Monroe.

In 1957, the Enrico Fermi Nuclear Generating Station first opened in Frenchtown Charter Township near Lake Erie. Today, the plant is operated by Detroit Edison but is entirely owned by parent company DTE Energy. In 1974, the Monroe Power Plant, currently the fourth largest coal firing plant in North America, opened. A third smokestack — shorter and wider than the other two — was constructed as the plant responds to meet environmental regulations. In 1929, Newton Steel opened a manufacturing plant on Lake Erie in Monroe, and this plant would later be purchased by Alcoa in 1942, Kelsey-Hayes in 1947, the Ford Motor Company in 1949 and subsequently under their Visteon division in 2000 and later as the Automotive Components Holdings in 2005. The plant, one of the most prominent manufacturing job in the county, produces various car parts for Ford. The plant itself is also well known for its high level of chemicals that once polluted Lake Erie and the River Raisin. Although threatened to close, the factory remains open with 1,200 employees. Today, the Port of Monroe remains heavily industrialized, and various other industries have moved to Monroe County in recent years. In 2001, Cabela's built a store in Dundee. As one of the largest stores of its kind, this location is a major tourist destination and has greatly improved the economy of Dundee. The Global Engine Manufacturing Alliance was also founded in Dundee in 2002.

Geography
Monroe is Michigan's only county on Lake Erie. The River Raisin and Sandy Creek flow through the county. Sterling State Park is the county's only state park and the only of Michigan's 98 state parks located on Lake Erie. The Detroit River International Wildlife Refuge extends south into Monroe County and includes part of the North Maumee Bay Archeological District.

Adjacent counties
Wayne County  (northeast)
Washtenaw County  (northwest)
Essex County, Ontario, Canada (east)
Lenawee County  (west)
Lucas County, Ohio  (south)

Climate
Monroe County lies in the humid continental climate zone. The county does not normally have extremely hot or cold temperatures. On average, the temperature only drops below  a couple of times during a winter season, and it is even rarer for the temperature to rise above  during the summer.

Severe weather events are very rare. Monroe County has experienced a total approximately 30 tornadoes since 1950. Infrequent waterspouts can also be seen out on Lake Erie. Many tornadoes have been a part of major outbreaks, and none have directly affected the heavily populated areas. Three separate F4 tornadoes killed 13 people during the 1965 Palm Sunday tornado outbreak on April 11, 1965. In the Super Outbreak of April 3–4, 1974, two tornadoes (one F2 and one F3) caused five deaths. The most tornadoes from a single storm came on August 29, 1979, when four tornadoes touched down in and near Monroe. However, the tornadoes were weak (three F1 and one F0), and there were no deaths.  The most recent tornado to touchdown and cause significant damage in the county struck Dundee Township in a minor outbreak that caused several tornadoes around the southern portion of Michigan on the morning of June 6, 2010.

Since Monroe is too far north and inland, no hurricanes have obviously struck Monroe County directly. However, some of the strongest hurricanes have affected the county in the form of a few irregular inches of increased rainfall, although by this point, they have no more power than a depression. Tropical Storm Candy (1968) traveled unusually far inland and dropped  of rain. Other storms, such as Hurricane Hugo (1989) and Hurricane Isabel (2003) also dropped trace amounts of rain with over  winds — long after they lost their hurricane status.

Demographics

As of the census of 2000, there were 145,945 people, 53,772 households, and 39,952 families residing in the county. The racial makeup of the county was 95.42% White, 1.90% Black or African American, 0.28% Native American, 0.47% Asian, 0.01% Pacific Islander, 0.62% from other races, and 1.31% from two or more races. 2.13% of the population were Hispanic or Latino of any race. 28.5% were of German, 8.9% American, 8.3% Polish, 8.2% French, 8.0% Irish, 7.5% English and 5.7% Italian ancestry, 96.4% spoke English and 1.5% Spanish as their first language.

There were 53,772 households, out of which 36.00% had children under the age of 18 living with them, 60.00% were married couples living together, 10.10% had a female household with no husband present, and 25.70% were non-families. 21.70% of all households were made up of individuals, and 8.50% had someone living alone who was 65 years of age or older. The average household size was 2.69 and the average family size was 3.14. In the county, the population was spread out, with 27.40% under the age of 18, 8.10% from 18 to 24, 29.80% from 25 to 44, 23.50% from 45 to 64, and 11.10% who were 65 years of age or older. The median age was 36 years. For every 100 females, there were 98.40 males. For every 100 females age 18 and over, there were 95.20 males. The median income for a household in the county was $51,743, and the median income for a family was $59,659. Males had a median income of $46,715 versus $27,421 for females. The per capita income for the county was $22,458. About 4.80% of families and 7.00% of the population were below the poverty line, including 8.10% of those under age 18 and 8.30% of those age 65 or over.

In the 2008 census report, the county's population was estimated at 152,949. The leading nationality was German at 34.9%, with Irish at 15.2% and French at 11.1%. Other national origins include 10.5% Polish and 8.9% English. The smallest population of any large nationality in the United States is Danish with only 45 people of Danish descent in the county.  The highest ethnicity reported in the county in 2008 was white at 95.3%. Black people accounted for only 2.4%, while other ethnic groups include 0.7% Asian and 0.3% total for Native Americans and Alaska Natives. Hispanic and Latino Americans accounted for 2.7%.

Education
Monroe County contains nine public school districts. There are approximately 23,000 students in public schools in Monroe County. Public school district boundaries are not conterminous with the county boundary or any municipality boundaries within the county. Monroe County is a  "district of choice" county, and students have the option to attend any district in the county, even if they do not live within a particular district. Students near the county line, especially those in northern locations such as Milan, Flat Rock, Milan Township, and London Township, are assigned to districts in the neighboring counties of Wayne and Washtenaw. Located primarily in Monroe County, Airport Community Schools and Whiteford Agricultural Schools have boundaries that extend into neighboring counties, so a small number of out-of-county students attend schools in Monroe County.

There are two charter schools in the county with a total of 750 students. There are also 15 parochial schools with approximately 2,200 students enrolled in the private sector.  The county is also served by one independent school district, the Monroe County Intermediate School District, which provides education services and staff support at all of the county's schools. Established in 1964 and first opened to students in 1967, Monroe County Community College is the only higher education institution in the county. Marygrove College, sponsored by the local Sisters, Servants of the Immaculate Heart of Mary (IHM), was founded in Monroe in 1905 as a Catholic, liberal arts college. The college then moved to its current location in Detroit in 1927. The IHM also operated a boarding school, the Hall of the Divine Child, in Monroe from 1918 to 1980. Students in the county may also be homeschooled.

K-12 education

Monroe County is served by 14 public school districts, with nine of them based in the county. The largest of these is Monroe Public Schools, which enrolls approximately 6,450 students in the city of Monroe and outlying area of the city limits.  With around 2,100 students, Monroe High School is one of the largest high schools in the state. The Monroe County Intermediate School District is an independent school district that provides services to both public and private schools in the county. Students in Monroe County can choose to enroll in any public school district in the county, granted the district has available space. If a student attends a school outside of their normal district, the school will usually not provide transportation for the student. The district boundary map is provided by the Michigan Department of Information Technology.  All district's athletic teams are governed by the Michigan High School Athletic Association. A small number of schools have been closed down or reused for different purposes, and some of the smaller districts consists of a single elementary school and a combined middle and high school.

Districts 
School districts include:

 Airport Community School District
 Bedford Public Schools
 Blissfield Community Schools
 Britton Deerfield School District
 Flat Rock Community Schools
 Dundee Community Schools
 Huron School District
 Ida Public School District
 Jefferson Schools
 Mason Consolidated Schools
 Milan Area Schools
 Monroe Public Schools
 Summerfield School District
 Whiteford Agricultural School District

Schools

Politics

Monroe County is a swing county in presidential elections. It has voted for the winning candidate for president in 13 of the last 16 presidential elections, the only exceptions being in 1968, 2000, and 2020. In 2016, Donald Trump received over 58% of the vote, the largest percentage since Ronald Reagan in 1984. In 2020, Trump outdid his 2016 total by winning 60.3% of the vote, possibly marking an end for Monroe's swing county status.

The county prohibits construction of solar power plants.

Landmarks and attractions

Custer Airport
Detroit River International Wildlife Refuge
Detroit River Light
Dundee Historic District
Eby Log Cabin
East Elm-North Macomb Street Historic District
Edward Loranger House
Enrico Fermi Nuclear Generating Station
George Armstrong Custer Equestrian Monument
Governor Robert McClelland House
Hall of the Divine Child, now the Norman Towers residence hall
Jefferson Avenue-Huron River Bridge
La-Z-Boy world headquarters
Martha Barker Country Store Museum
Monroe County Fair (Stock Arena)
Monroe County Historical Museum
Monroe County Labor History Museum
Monroe County Vietnam Veterans Historical Museum
Monroe Multi-Sports Complex
Monroe Power Plant
Navarre-Anderson Trading Post
North Maumee Bay Archeological District
Old Mill Museum
Old Village Historic District
Pointe Mouillee State Game Area
River Raisin Battlefield Visitor Center
River Raisin National Battlefield Park
River Raisin Centre for the Arts
Rudolph Nims House
St. Mary's Church Complex Historic District
St. Michael the Archangel Church
Sawyer House
Sisters, Servants of the Immaculate Heart of Mary
Southern Michigan Timberwolves are based in Monroe.
Sterling State Park
The Mall of Monroe (formerly known as Frenchtown Square Mall)
Weis Manufacturing Company
Woodland Cemetery

Transportation

Portions of Monroe County are served by the Lake Erie Transit public transportation bus system. Established in 1975, Lake Erie Transit currently has a fleet of 31 buses and serves approximately 400,000 riders every year. In 2008, the system logged 764,000 miles.  The system operates buses on eight fixed routes in and around the city of Monroe. It also serves several neighboring townships outside of its normal routes should a passenger call ahead for a ride. From Bedford Township, its provides transportation to and from two shopping malls in Toledo, Ohio.

 travels through the eastern portion of the county and provides access to Toledo to the south and Detroit to the north. I-75 provides an uninterrupted route as far south as South Florida and as far north as the Sault Ste. Marie International Bridge.
 has its southern terminus just north of Monroe in the northeast portion of the county. Splitting off from I-75, I-275 is a western bypass around Detroit but does not actually merge back with I-75. I-275 serves as a main route to the Metro Airport.
 runs along the western portion of the county, passing right through Dundee and proceeding north through Ann Arbor. US 23 is a limited-access freeway with interchanges rather than intersections.
 travels through Monroe and provides access to Toledo and western portions of Detroit. The road is known locally as North Telegraph and South Telegraph—divided at the River Raisin. US 24 also connects to I-275 just north of Monroe.
 was the designated name for the portion of Dixie Highway north of Cincinnati, including the portion running through Monroe. Like Dixie Highway, US 25 was largely replaced, and the existing highway was truncated at Cincinnati.
 only runs a short distance through the southwestern corner of the county, where it connects Toledo to US 127 in Michigan. In Monroe County, it is known as St. Anthony Road, and the US 223 designation continues on a 90° bend south with US 23.
 has its eastern terminus is in Monroe at US 24 and provides a direct route from Monroe to Dundee and further into the state. In Monroe, M-50 is known locally as South Custer Road. In Dundee, it is referred to as East Monroe Street and, after the River Raisin, Tecumseh Road.
 travels directly through downtown Monroe before merging into US 24 north of Monroe. South of downtown after Jones Avenue, it is called South Dixie Highway. In the downtown area, it is South Monroe Street. North of the River Raisin, it is North Monroe Street.
 was a state highway existing from 1930 to 1955 and ran along the north banks of the River Raisin. In 1955, control of the highway was transferred back to the county and is now called North Custer Road.
 was a state highway existing from 1935 to 1977. It ran through the southern portion of the county, connecting US 23 to the now-decommissioned US 25. Today, the road is called Samaria Road, with the eastern portion called Lakeside Road.
 Dixie Highway ran through Monroe County in as early as 1915. Originally one of the few ways to reach places like Florida, the highway was largely replaced by I-75 beginning in the 1960s. Today, the namesake of the highway is used for two non-connecting highways (one being M-125), although the same route and remnants of the original highway are long gone.
 Custer Airport was built in 1946 and is located just west of downtown Monroe. It is a general aviation airport, with no commercial or passenger service. The airport has one paved runway primarily used by small private aircraft. There is also a small aviation school on the site.
 Toledo Suburban Airport, not to be confused with the much larger Toledo Express Airport, is located in the southwest portion of the county near Lambertville. Like the Custer Airport, this is a general aviation facility with one paved runway and no scheduled flights. It serves as a fueling station, a test center, and a flight instruction center.

Communities

Cities
Flat Rock (partial)
Luna Pier
Milan (partial)
Monroe (county seat)
Petersburg

Villages
Carleton
Dundee
Estral Beach
Maybee
South Rockwood

Charter townships
Berlin Charter Township
Frenchtown Charter Township
Monroe Charter Township

Civil townships

Ash Township
Bedford Township
Dundee Township
Erie Township
Exeter Township
Ida Township
La Salle Township
London Township
Milan Township
Raisinville Township
Summerfield Township
Whiteford Township

Census-designated places

Detroit Beach
Ida
Lambertville
South Monroe
Stony Point
Temperance
West Monroe
Woodland Beach

Other unincorporated communities

 Avalon Beach
 Azalia
 Bolles Harbor
 Cone
 Diann
 Erie
 Evergreen Acres
 Exeter
 Golfcrest
 Grand View
 Grape
 Hillcrest Orchard
 Ida Center
 La Salle
 Liberty Corners
 London
 Lost Peninsula
 Lulu
 Newport
 North Shores
 Oakville
 Oldport
 Ottawa
 Ottawa Lake
 Patterson Gardens
 Petersburg Junction
 Pointe aux Peaux
 Rea
 Saint Anthony
 Samaria
 Scofield
 Steiner
 Stony Creek
 Strasburg
 Vienna
 Vienna Junction
 Whiteford Center
 Yargerville

Notable people
Betty Whiting (1925–1967), All-American Girls Professional Baseball League player
Boston Custer (1848–1876), younger brother of George Custer, lived in Monroe
Bronco McKart (b. 1971), former World Boxing Organization champion
Carl Ford (b. 1980), American football player
Charles Blue Jacket (1817–1897), Shawnee chief who lived in northern Monroe County
Christie Brinkley (b. 1954), model who was born in Monroe
Elizabeth Bacon Custer (1842–1933), wife of General Custer, was born in Monroe
Elizabeth Caroline Crosby (1888-1983), noted neuroanatomist, was born and lived in Petersburg
Elizabeth McWebb (1904–2004), author of the Little Brown Bear book series
Elroy M. Avery (1844–1935), politician, author, and historian who was born in Erie Township
Eric Wilson (b. 1978), Canadian football player for the Montreal Alouettes
Ernest Ingersoll (1852–1946), environmentalist and naturalist
George Armstrong Custer (1839–1876), Major General who lived much of his early life in Monroe
George Spalding (1836–1915), former teacher and politician
Harry L. Corl (1914–1942), Navy Cross recipient who lived in Lambertville
Henry Armstrong Reed (1858–1876), nephew of George Custer, lived in Monroe
Isaac P. Christiancy (1812–1890), former Chief Justice of the Michigan Supreme Court
J. Sterling Morton (1832–1902), prominent conservationist who lived in Monroe from 1834 to 1854
Kaye Lani Rae Rafko (b. 1963), native from Monroe who was the 1988 Miss America winner
Mary Harris Jones (1837–1930), union organizer who moved to Monroe from Ireland
Megan Moulton-Levy (b. 1985), collegiate tennis player born in Monroe
Oswald J. Gaynier (1915–1942), Navy Cross recipient who was born in Monroe
Rico Hoye (b. 1974), professional boxer
Robert McCelland (1807–1880), prominent Michigan politician
Vern Sneider (1916–1981), American novelist who lived in Monroe
Vic Braden (1929-2014), former tennis champion and coach

See also

 List of Michigan State Historic Sites in Monroe County, Michigan
 National Register of Historic Places listings in Monroe County, Michigan
 Monroe County, Kentucky

References

Further reading
Nicholas, J.R., G.L. Rowe, and J.R. Brannen. (1996). Hydrology, water quality, and effects of drought in Monroe County, Michigan [Water-Resources Investigations Report 94-4161]. Lansing, MI: U.S. Department of the Interior, U.S. Geological Survey.

External links
official Monroe County website
Monroe County Library System
Monroe County Historical Museum Archives: 'Monroe in History' images — online photographs collection.

Official Website of the Monroe County MI Historical Society

 
Michigan counties
Metro Detroit
1817 establishments in Michigan Territory
Populated places established in 1817